Boris Tikhonovich Dobrodeyev (28 April 1927 – 23 September 2022) was a Russian screenwriter. He was honored with the medals Order "For Merit to the Fatherland", Order of Friendship, Order of the Badge of Honour, Lenin Prize, Vasilyev Brothers State Prize of the RSFSR, Shevchenko National Prize and Honored Artist of the RSFSR.

Dobrodeev's work included writing for the documentary film Recollections of Pavlovsk. He died in September 2022, at the age of 95.

References

External links 

1927 births
2022 deaths
Soviet screenwriters
20th-century Russian screenwriters
Male screenwriters
Writers from Voronezh
Recipients of the Order "For Merit to the Fatherland", 3rd class
Recipients of the Vasilyev Brothers State Prize of the RSFSR
Recipients of the Shevchenko National Prize
Lenin Prize winners